Hmuifang is a tourist spot near Aizawl, Mizoram. It is about 50 km from Aizawl.  With an elevation of 1619 metres the mountain is covered with forests reserves since all the Mizo Chief's time.

History
Hmuifang Tourist resort has been  built right on the former land of Lallianvunga the erstwhile chief who used to rule over the villages in the mountain. Hmuifang is also the source of Tuirial River.

Thalfavang Kut
Thalfavang Kut, a Mizo festival is being regularly being held in Hmuifang organized the Tourism Department of Mizoram to promote Tourism. Different Mizo dances like Cheraw, Sawlakai, Siktuithiang lam and Chheihlam  are showcased in the festival.

See also
Tourism in Mizoram

References

External links
Hmuifang

Tourist attractions in Mizoram
Tourism in Mizoram
Hills of Mizoram
Lushai Hills